Aleksandr Mikhailovich Lesnoy (born 28 July 1988) is Russian athlete specialising in the shot put. He won the gold medal at the 2013 Summer Universiade.

His personal bests in the event are 21.40 metres outdoors (Sochi 2014) and 20.51 metres indoors (Moscow 2014).

International competitions

References

1988 births
Living people
Athletes from Moscow
Russian male shot putters
Universiade gold medalists in athletics (track and field)
Universiade gold medalists for Russia
Medalists at the 2013 Summer Universiade
Authorised Neutral Athletes at the World Athletics Championships
World Athletics Championships athletes for Russia
World Athletics Championships medalists
European Athletics Championships medalists
Russian Athletics Championships winners